Joseph Sexton is an American journalist who has been a senior editor at ProPublica since 2013. Formerly, he was a metropolitan news editor at The New York Times for seven years. Before that, he had been deputy metropolitan news editor since 2003.

As deputy metropolitan news editor for investigations and enterprise, Sexton oversaw a series of reporting by Clifford J. Levy on the abuse of mentally ill adults in group homes in New York which won the Pulitzer Prize for Investigative Reporting in 2003.

Education
Sexton studied Irish politics, history and literature at the School of Irish Studies in Dublin, Ireland in 1980, then received a B.A. degree in English from the University of Wisconsin–Madison in 1982.

Career 
In 1984 Sexton was a founding member of The City Sun, an African American weekly newspaper based in Brooklyn that was co-founded by Andrew W. Cooper. The City Sun ceased publication in 1996. He has also worked for The Record, The Post-Standard and United Press International. Sexton's work has also been published in Pacific Standard, HuffPost, and The National Memo newsletter.

Sexton joined the Times in 1987 as a sports reporter, covering major league baseball and the National Hockey League. While working for The New York Times, Sexton covered the Eliot Spitzer prostitution scandal, 2012 Summer Olympics, Penn State child sex abuse scandal, and other stories.

Sexton also worked as a reporter for the metropolitan desk and as an enterprise editor for the sports desk.

Bibliography

Anthologies
 McGuane, Thomas; and Stout, Glenn. The Best American Sports Writing 1992. New York: Houghton Mifflin, 1992.

References

1960 births
Living people
University of Wisconsin–Madison College of Letters and Science alumni
American male journalists
The New York Times editors
Place of birth missing (living people)
20th-century American journalists